Ma Ning (born 29 September 2000) is a field hockey player from China, who plays as a defender.

Career

Under–18
In 2018, Ma Ning captained the Chinese U–18 team to a bronze medal at the Youth Olympics in Buenos Aires.

National team
Ma Ning made her debut for the national team in 2021 at the Asian Champions Trophy in Donghae City.

References

External links

2000 births
Living people
Female field hockey defenders
Chinese female field hockey players
Field hockey players at the 2018 Summer Youth Olympics